There are several islands named Strawberry Island:

Strawberry Island (Lake Simcoe) - Ontario
Strawberry Island (Deception Pass, Washington)
Strawberry Island (Rosario Strait, Washington)
Strawberry Island, in the Snake River near the confluence with the Columbia River, Franklin County, Washington
Strawberry Island (New York), an island in the Niagara River
Strawberry Island (Hamilton County, New York), an island on Raquette Lake

See also 
 Strawberry Islands, a chain of islands in Wisconsin